John or Jack Robson may refer to:

In sports
 Jack Robson (football manager) (1860–1922), English full-time secretary manager of football clubs, including Middlesbrough and Manchester United
 Jack Robson (footballer), English footballer 
 John Robson (Australian footballer) (1933–2011), played with Richmond and St Kilda in the VFL
 John Robson (footballer, born 1950) (1950–2004), English football full-back for Derby County and Aston Villa
 John Robson (athlete) (born 1957), British middle-distance runner
 John Robson (canoeist), British canoe sailor
 Doug Robson (1942–2020), born John Douglas Robson and listed as John Robson in some databases, English football centre half for Darlington

Other people
 John Robson (priest) (1581–1645), English Anglican priest who was elected to the House of Commons in 1621
 John Robson (politician) (1824–1892), Canadian journalist and politician, Premier of the Province of British Columbia
 Jack Robson (songwriter) (1885–1957), English Northumberland-born singer, musician and songwriter
 John Robson (public servant) (1909–1993), New Zealand public servant and penal reformer
 John E. Robson (1930–2002), American attorney and United States Deputy Secretary of the Treasury